The discography of South Korean pop music group g.o.d includes eight studio albums, a compilation album and a single album. Debuting in 1999, the quintet released five studio albums before the departure of a member. The remaining members released another two albums as a quartet before going on an extended hiatus. Their eighth album was released in July 2014 to mark their reunion as a quintet and the 15th anniversary of their debut.

Albums

Studio albums

Reissues

Compilations

Single albums

Singles

Other charted songs

Contributed singles and tracks

Video albums

Music videos

Other appearances

Notes

References

External links
g.o.d Profile and Discography — Mnet
g.o.d — iTunes

Discography
Discographies of South Korean artists
K-pop music group discographies
Rhythm and blues discographies